Herbert Richard Baumeister (April 7, 1947 – July 3, 1996) was an American businessman and serial killer. A resident of the Indianapolis suburb of Westfield, Indiana, Baumeister was under investigation for murdering over a dozen men in the early 1990s, most of whom were last seen at gay bars. Police found the remains of eleven men, eight identified, on Baumeister's property. Baumeister committed suicide after a warrant was issued for his arrest. He was later linked to a series of murders of at least twelve men along Interstate 70, which occurred in the early to mid-1980s.

Early life
Herbert Baumeister was born in Indianapolis, Indiana, the oldest of four children born to Herbert and Elizabeth Baumeister. His childhood was reportedly normal but he began exhibiting anti-social behavior by the onset of adolescence, playing with dead animals and urinating on a teacher's desk. In his teens, Baumeister was diagnosed with schizophrenia but did not receive further psychiatric treatment.

In 1965, Baumeister attended Indiana University for a semester before dropping out, but returned in 1967. In 1972, he attended a semester at Butler University. As an adult, Baumeister drifted through a series of jobs, marked by a strong work ethic but also by increasingly bizarre behavior.

Baumeister married Juliana "Julie" Saiter in November 1971, a union that produced three children. Julie later said they had been sexually intimate only six times in over 25 years of marriage. In the 1970s, Baumeister was committed to a psychiatric hospital by his father; his wife said he was "hurting and needed help."

Baumeister founded the successful Sav-A-Lot thrift store chain (two stores total) in Indianapolis in 1988.

Investigation
By the early 1990s, investigators with the Marion County Sheriff's Department and the Indianapolis Police Department began investigating the disappearances of gay men of similar age, height, and weight in the Indianapolis area. In 1992, they were contacted by a man named Tony Harris claiming that a gay bar patron calling himself "Brian Smart" had killed a friend of his, and had attempted to kill him with a pool hose during an erotic asphyxiation session. Harris eventually saw this man again in August 1995, following his car and noting his license plate number. From this data, police identified "Brian Smart" as Herb Baumeister.
   
Investigators approached Baumeister, told him he was a suspect in the disappearances, and asked to search his house. Both Baumeister and his wife, Julie, refused to allow a search of their property. By June 1996, however, Julie had become sufficiently frightened by her husband's erratic behavior that, after filing for divorce, she consented to a search. The search of the  estate, Fox Hollow Farm, was conducted while Baumeister was on vacation. It turned up the remains of eleven men, eight of whom were identified. The eight identified victims were John Lee Bayer, Richard Douglas Hamilton, Steven S. Hale, Allen Wayne Broussard, Jeffrey A Jones,  Manuel Resendez, Roger Allen Goodlet, and Michael Frederick Keirn.

With a warrant out for his arrest, Baumeister fled to Ontario, where he committed suicide at Pinery Provincial Park on Lake Huron by shooting himself in the head. In his suicide note, he described his failing marriage and business as his reason for killing himself. He did not confess to the murders of the men found in his backyard.  Hamilton County Coroner's office has requested anyone with missing family members from the mid-1980s to mid-1990s to complete a DNA test in an effort to help identify victim remains.

Death and posthumous investigation
Baumeister would posthumously be suspected of killing twelve other men, the bodies of whom were found in rural areas along the corridor of Interstate 70 between Indianapolis and Columbus, Ohio, during the early to mid 1980s. One eyewitness identified Baumeister as the man seen leaving a bar in 1983 with Michael Riley, who was later found dead. Like the other victims, Riley was strangled to death and deposited nude or semi-nude in a river.

Media coverage
The A&E television series Investigative Reports aired an episode about Baumeister titled The Secret Life of a Serial Killer in 1997. History featured the case in their Perfect Crimes series. The case was also featured on The Investigators on TruTV in 2008, Behind Mansion Walls on Investigation Discovery (ID), Paranormal Witness on Syfy in 2012, and Ghost Adventures in May 2014. An independent documentary film titled The Haunting of Fox Hollow Farm also explores the crimes and the possibility of hauntings on the grounds of Baumeister's former estate.

ID featured the case again on the series True Nightmares, in October 2015. The Crime Junkie podcast released an episode on Baumeister on March 4, 2018. The Monster Presents: Insomniac podcast released a two-part episode about the case on June 27, 2019. The All Things Comedy Mexican podcast Leyendas Legendarias released an episode where they talked about the case on October 14, 2020.

Georgia Hardstark covered the case on the podcast, My Favorite Murder, in episode 67, "Live at the Egyptian Room", during a live performance in Indianapolis.

See also 
I-70 Strangler
List of serial killers in the United States
List of serial killers by number of victims

References

Further reading
Fannie Weinstein; Melinda Wilson (September 15, 1998), Where the Bodies Are Buried, St. Martin's Press,  
Ryan Green, You Think You Know Me: The True Story of Herb Baumeister and the Horror at Fox Hollow Farm (Ryan Green Publishing, 2018)

External links
 Crime Library: "HERB BAUMEISTER: SKELETONS BEYOND THE CLOSET" (story archived on December 13, 2007)
Herb Baumeister "The I-70 Strangler"

1947 births
1996 deaths
1996 suicides
20th-century American businesspeople
20th-century American criminals
20th-century American LGBT people
American male criminals
American serial killers
Businesspeople from Indiana
Crime in Indianapolis
Criminals from Indiana
LGBT people from Indiana
Murder in Indiana
People from Westfield, Indiana
People with schizophrenia
Suicides by firearm in Ontario
Violence against gay men in the United States
Violence against men in North America